Lim Su-jeong or Im Soo-jung may refer to:

 Im Soo-jung (born 1979), South Korean actress
 Lim Su-jeong (taekwondo) (born 1986), South Korean taekwondo practitioner
 Lim Su-jeong (kickboxer) (born 1985), South Korean Muay Thai kickboxer